Off the Road: Twenty Years with Cassady, Kerouac and Ginsberg is an autobiographical book by Carolyn Cassady. Originally published in 1990 as Off the Road: My Years with Cassady, Kerouac, and Ginsberg, it was republished by London's Black Spring Press, coinciding with the fiftieth anniversary of Jack Kerouac's On the Road. Off the Road recounts the history of Carolyn Cassady, wife of Jack Kerouac's traveling companion and On the Roads hero Neal Cassady. As Neal's wife and Kerouac's intermittent lover, Carolyn Cassady was well situated to record the inception of the Beat Generation and its influence on American culture.

Off the Road begins in the initial stages of Kerouac and Neal Cassady's friendship, when Kerouac was a struggling author trying to publish his first novel (1950's The Town and the City), and documents important moments in the beat movement such as the success of On the Road and Allen Ginsberg's "Howl."

Publication history
1990, UK, Black Spring Press, 436 pp, hardcover, 
1990, USA, William Morrow, 436 pp, hardcover, 
1991, UK, Penguin. 1 August 1991, 464 pp, paperback, 
2007, UK, Black Spring Press, 12 July 2007, 448 pp, paperback,

See also
Love Always, Carolyn, 2011 documentary film on Carolyn, covering similar subject material.

References
Darlington, Andy. "Carolyn Cassady: On and Off the Road." Moody Street Irregulars: A Jack Kerouac Magazine 24-26 (1991), 13-18.

External links
 Interview with Carolyn Cassady on American Legends
 Interview with Carolyn Cassady on BBC website (not longer available)
 Excerpt
 Brief biography of Carolyn Cassady on Literary Kicks website
 Victoria Mixon's Interviews with Carolyn Cassady

Books about the Beat Generation
2007 non-fiction books
On the Road
Jack Kerouac